20,000 Watt R.S.L. is a compilation album by Australian rock band Midnight Oil released in October 1997 on their own label Sprint Music.  The word "Collection" appears on the front of the CD along the hinge in the same type face as the title and the name of the band and may have been intended as part of the album's title; however, it does not appear on the spine.  The release has also been distributed inside a cardboard sleeve which adds "Midnight Oil: The Hits" to the album art, distinguishing it as a compilation album.

The compilation covers the majority of Midnight Oil's career, starting with their 1979 album Head Injuries, and includes tracks from all their major studio releases (and one EP), even including two songs from the forthcoming Redneck Wonderland album, which was released after this compilation in 1998. The compilation does not include any material from the band's eponymous 1978 debut album or the Bird Noises EP (1980). The liner notes contain an essay on the band by Australian author Tim Winton.

The album peaked at #1 on the Australian Recording Industry Association (ARIA) album charts, and achieved 5×Platinum sales, it also peaked at #18 in New Zealand.

In 2012, Midnight Oil released the 2-disc compilation album Essential Oils, a more comprehensive summary of the band's career, and which includes material from all of the band's studio albums and EPs between 1978 and 2002. There is only one song ("What Goes On") included in 20,000 Watt R.S.L. that is not included in Essential Oils.

Background
Midnight Oil are an Australian rock band from Sydney formed in 1976 with vocalist Peter Garrett, drummer Rob Hirst, bass guitarist Andrew James and keyboardist/lead guitarist Jim Moginie, Guitarist Martin Rotsey joined in 1977 and Midnight Oil established their own record label Powderworks, they released their second album Head Injuries on this label in October 1979. Founding bass guitarist James left due to illness in 1980, he was replaced by Peter Gifford, Gifford was himself replaced by Bones Hillman in 1987.

Australian Top Ten singles were "Power and the Passion", "The Dead Heart", "Beds Are Burning" and "Blue Sky Mine". Aside from chart success both "Power and the Passion" and "Beds Are Burning" were listed by Australasian Performing Right Association (APRA) in the Top 30 best Australian songs of all time in 2001. Through a long and distinguished career, the band became known for its driving hard-rock sound, intense live performances and political activism, particularly in aid of anti-nuclear, environmentalist and indigenous causes.

The title refers to the Returned Servicemen's League, whose clubs the band has performed in, and the typical power used by a public address system.

Track listing
Songwriters according to Australasian Performing Right Association (APRA):
 "What Goes On" (Garrett, Hillman, Hirst, Moginie, Rotsey)
 "Power and the Passion" (Garrett, Hirst, Moginie)
 "Dreamworld" (Garrett, Hirst, Moginie)
 "White Skin Black Heart" (Garrett, Hillman, Hirst, Moginie, Rotsey)
 "Kosciuszko" (Hirst, Moginie)
 "The Dead Heart" (Garrett, Hirst, Moginie)
 "Blue Sky Mine" (Garrett, Hillman, Hirst, Moginie, Rotsey)
 "US Forces" (Garrett, Moginie)
 "Beds Are Burning" (Garrett, Hirst, Moginie)
 "One Country" (Garrett, Moginie)
 "Best of Both Worlds" (Hirst, Moginie)
 "Truganini" (Hirst, Moginie)
 "King of the Mountain" (Hirst, Moginie)
 "Hercules" (Garrett, Hirst, Moginie)
 "Surf's Up Tonight" (Garrett, Hillman, Hirst, Moginie, Rotsey)
 "Back on the Borderline" (Garrett, Hirst, James)
 "Don't Wanna Be the One" (Garrett, Hirst, Moginie, Rotsey)
 "Forgotten Years" (Hirst, Moginie)

Charts

Weekly charts

Year-end charts

Certifications

Album

Video

Personnel
Midnight Oil
Peter Garrett – vocals, harmonica
Peter Gifford – bass, vocals (on tracks 2, 3, 5, 6, 8, 9, 11, 14, 17)
Bones Hillman – bass, vocals (on tracks 1, 4, 7, 10, 12, 13, 15, 18)
Rob Hirst – drums, vocals
Andrew James – bass (on track 16)
Jim Moginie – guitars, keyboards, vocals
Martin Rotsey – guitars

Additional personnel
 Gary Barnacle, Peter Thoms, Luke Tunney - brass on 'Power and the Passion'

References

External links
 Midnight Oil
 ARC Album Review

Midnight Oil compilation albums
1997 greatest hits albums
CBS Records compilation albums